West St. Clair Township is a township in Bedford County, Pennsylvania, United States. The population was 1,648 at the 2020 census.

History
The Dr. Knisley Covered Bridge and Ryot Covered Bridge were listed on the National Register of Historic Places in 1980.

Geography
West St. Clair Township is located in northwestern Bedford County and is bordered to the west by Somerset County. The borough of Pleasantville (or "Alum Bank") is surrounded by the township but is separate from it.

Demographics

As of the census of 2000, there were 1,647 people, 594 households, and 472 families residing in the township.  The population density was 55.0 people per square mile (21.2/km2).  There were 681 housing units at an average density of 22.7/sq mi (8.8/km2).  The racial makeup of the township was 98.12% White, 0.12% Native American, 0.18% Asian, 0.67% from other races, and 0.91% from two or more races. Hispanic or Latino of any race were 1.03% of the population.

There were 594 households, out of which 37.0% had children under the age of 18 living with them, 69.5% were married couples living together, 6.6% had a female householder with no husband present, and 20.5% were non-families. 18.4% of all households were made up of individuals, and 8.9% had someone living alone who was 65 years of age or older.  The average household size was 2.77 and the average family size was 3.14.

In the township the population was spread out, with 28.0% under the age of 18, 7.2% from 18 to 24, 29.5% from 25 to 44, 22.1% from 45 to 64, and 13.2% who were 65 years of age or older.  The median age was 36 years. For every 100 females there were 100.1 males.  For every 100 females age 18 and over, there were 97.3 males.

The median income for a household in the township was $32,222, and the median income for a family was $33,750. Males had a median income of $27,792 versus $17,644 for females. The per capita income for the township was $13,440.  About 14.0% of families and 15.7% of the population were below the poverty line, including 22.8% of those under age 18 and 13.7% of those age 65 or over.

References

Populated places established in 1782
Townships in Bedford County, Pennsylvania
1782 establishments in Pennsylvania